is a town in Myōzai District, Tokushima Prefecture, Japan.

Geography 
Kamiyama is located in the upper reaches of the Akui River, which runs parallel to the south side of the Yoshino River in central Tokushima Prefecture on the island of Shikoku. Located in the eastern part of the Shikoku Mountains, about 83% of the total area is mountainous, with agricultural land and settlements scattered in the Akui River basin that crosses the center of the town from east to west. Parts of the town are within the borders of the Chūbu Sankei Prefectural Natural Park or the Higashi Sankei Prefectural Natural Park.

Neighbouring municipalities 
Tokushima Prefecture
 Tokushima
 Yoshinogawa
 Mima
 Ishii
 Naka
 Kamikatsu
 Sanagōchi

Climate
Kamiyama has a Humid subtropical climate (Köppen Cfa) characterized by warm summers and cool winters with light snowfall.  The average annual temperature in Kamiyama is 14.5 °C. The average annual rainfall is 2137 mm with September as the wettest month. The temperatures are highest on average in August, at around 25.4 °C, and lowest in January, at around 3.9 °C.

Demographics
Per Japanese census data, the population of Kamiyama has been rapidly declining for the past 70 years.

History 
As with all of Tokushima Prefecture, the area of Kamiyama was part of ancient Awa Province. The area has been settled since ancient times and is mentioned in the Nihon Shoki. During the Edo period, the area was part of the holdings of Tokushima Domain ruled by the Hachisuka clan from their seat at Tokushima Castle. The villages of Ano (阿野村), Jinryō (神領村), Orono (鬼籠野村),  Shimobun-Kamiyama (下分上山村), and  Kamibun-Kamiyama (上分上山村) were established within Myōzai District, Tokushima with the creation of the modern municipalities system on October 1, 1889. These five villages merged to form the town of Kamiyama on November 20, 1965.

Government
Kamiyama has a mayor-council form of government with a directly elected mayor and a unicameral town council of eight members. Kamiyama, together with the other municipalities of Myōzai District, contributes two members to the Tokushima Prefectural Assembly. In terms of national politics, the town is part of Tokushima 1st district of the lower house of the Diet of Japan.

Economy
The economy of Kamiyama is agricultural, and the town is the largest producer of sudachi in Japan, accounting for 24% of the production in Tokushima Prefecture. Kamiyama is notable for its successes in minimizing its population decline through digital transformation efforts and promotion as a rural startup ecosystem.

Education
Kamiyama has two public elementary schools and one public middle school operated by the town government and one public high school operated by the Tokushima Prefectural Department of Education.

Transportation

Railway
Kamiyama does not have any passenger rail service. The closest station is the JR Shikoku Tokushima Station, which is approximately 50 minutes away by car.

Highways

Local attractions
 Shōsan-ji , 12th  temple on the Shikoku Pilgrimage
 Amagoi Waterfalls, one of "Japan’s Top 100 Waterfalls", 
Kamiichinomiya Ōawa Jinja, one of the shrines claiming to be the ichinomiya of Awa Province.
 Okubo Chichi-Icho Ginkgo tree
Chūbu Sankei Prefectural Natural Park
Higashi Sankei Prefectural Natural Park

Notes

External links

  (in Japanese)
  (in English)

Towns in Tokushima Prefecture
Kamiyama, Tokushima